Hildburghausen I – Schmalkalden-Meiningen III is an electoral constituency (German: Wahlkreis) represented in the Landtag of Thuringia. It elects one member via first-past-the-post voting. Under the current constituency numbering system, it is designated as constituency 18. It covers the western part of Hildburghausen district and part of southern Schmalkalden-Meiningen.

Hildburghausen I – Schmalkalden-Meiningen III was created in 1990 for the first state election. Originally named Hildburghausen I, it was given its current name in 2014 after part of Schmalkalden-Meiningen was transferred to the constituency. Since 2019, it has been represented by Nadine Hoffmann of Alternative for Germany (AfD).

Geography
As of the 2019 state election, Hildburghausen I – Schmalkalden-Meiningen III covers the western part of Hildburghausen district and part of southern Schmalkalden-Meiningen, specifically the municipalities of Ahlstädt, Beinerstadt, Bischofrod, Dingsleben, Ehrenberg, Eichenberg, Grimmelshausen, Grub, Heldburg, Henfstädt, Hildburghausen, Kloster Veßra, Lengfeld, Marisfeld, Oberstadt, Reurieth, Römhild, Schlechtsart, Schmeheim, Schweickershausen, St.Bernhard, Straufhain, Themar, Ummerstadt, Veilsdorf, and Westhausen (from Hildburghausen), and Grabfeld (without Wölfershausen) from Schmalkalden-Meiningen.

Members
The constituency was held by the Christian Democratic Union from its creation in 1990 until 2009, during which time it was represented by Hans-Henning Axthelm (1990–1994), Heinrich Dietz (1994–2004), and Michael Krapp (2004–2009). It was won by The Left in 2009, and was represented by Tilo Kummer. The CDU's candidate Kristin Floßmann regained the constituency in 2014. It was won by Alternative for Germany in 2019, and is represented by Nadine Hoffmann.

Election results

2019 election

2014 election

2009 election

2004 election

1999 election

1994 election

1990 election

References

Electoral districts in Thuringia
1990 establishments in Germany
Hildburghausen (district)
Schmalkalden-Meiningen
Constituencies established in 1990